China National may refer to:

 China National Heavy Duty Truck Group, a truck manufacturing state-owned enterprise in People's Republic of China
 China National Petroleum Corporation, a state-owned oil and gas corporation
 China National Tobacco Corporation, a state-owned manufacturer of tobacco products